Justice Anderson may refer to:

Albert Anderson (Montana judge) (1876–1948), associate justice of the Montana Supreme Court
Alexander O. Anderson (1794–1869), Tennessee lawyer who served in the United States Senate, and as a judge on the California Supreme Court from 1851 to 1853
Barry Anderson (born 1954), associate justice of the Minnesota Supreme Court
Donald B. Anderson (1904–1956), associate justice of the Idaho Supreme Court
E. Riley Anderson (1932–2018), former chief justice of the Tennessee Supreme Court
Forrest H. Anderson (1913–1989), associate justice of the Montana Supreme Court from 1953 to 1956
Francis T. Anderson (1808–1887), judge on the Virginia Supreme Court of Appeals from 1870 to 1883
Frank Anderson (judge) (1870–1931), associate justice of the South Dakota Supreme Court
John C. Anderson (judge) (1863–1940), associate justice and chief justice of the Alabama Supreme Court
John W. Anderson (Iowa judge) (1871–1954), associate justice of the Iowa Supreme Court
Paul Anderson (judge) (born 1943), associate justice of the Minnesota Supreme Court
Ralph J. Anderson (1888–1962), associate justice of the Montana Supreme Court
Reuben V. Anderson (born 1943), associate justice of the Supreme Court of Mississippi
Thomas H. Anderson (judge) (1848–1916), associate justice of the Supreme Court of the District of Columbia
Thomas J. Anderson (judge) (1837–1910), associate justice of the Territorial Utah Supreme Court
Russell A. Anderson (1942–2020), the 20th chief justice of the Minnesota Supreme Court
Walker Anderson (1801–1857), associate justice of the Florida Supreme Court from 1851 to 1853
William Dozier Anderson (1862–1952), associate justice of the Supreme Court of Mississippi

See also
James A. Andersen (1924–2022), associate justice of the Washington Supreme Court
Judge Anderson, fictional character in Judge Dredd comic books
Judge Anderson (disambiguation)